Naushad N. Merali, CBS (2 January 1951 – 3 July 2021) was the founder of the Kenyan mobile service provider Kencell along with French media giant Vivendi. Merali became famous in an almost folk tale for a corporate boardroom manoeuvre that earned him a $20million dollar profit in one hour thanks to pre-emptive rights of his stake in private Telecom company Kencell Kenya in 2004.  He attended Highway Secondary School in the suburbs of Nairobi, Kenya. As one of Kenya's leading industrialists, Merali brought commercial development in Kenya for more than 30 years and was constantly expanding his businesses throughout East Africa.

Based on annual Forbes ranking of Africa's richest in Kenya Merali was the third richest man in Kenya and 48th richest man in Africa, with a net worth of $370 million, as of November 2015. He ranked behind Bhimji Depar Shah and family Kenya's richest with a net worth of $700M who ranked 31st richest man in Africa as of November 2015 and Narendra Raval of Devki Group, who ranked second richest in Kenya with a net worth of $400 million.

Early life and education
Merali was born in January 1951 in Mombasa. Merali's grandfather emigrated from India in 1883 settling along Kenya's coast. His family later moved to Moshi Tanzania where Merali attended primary school with his three brothers and three sisters. Upon introduction of Socialist principles in Tanzania that were then unfavourable, Merali later moved to Nairobi in 1969 and completed high school at Highway Secondary School. Merali then attended a college of accounts and finance at a college on Oxford street in London.

Merali started his business career in his 20's as a finance clerk of Ryce Motors in Nairobi in the 1970s, later buying the company from its retiree owner at 24 using a bank loan of $2,350 from Bank of America in 1975, today known as Commercial Bank of Africa Group.

He transformed his life after becoming managing director of the company, by expanding the company's premises, repaid his loan and transformed it into a profitable enterprise. Within 6 years of becoming managing director of Ryce, Merali invested in construction company H Young as his first buyout and by 1985 bought commercial bank, Commercial Bank of Africa Group by forming a consortium that included the Kenyatta family.

Career

WPH Kenya Tea Company
From the 1980s to March 2005, Merali was the director of the now-defunct W.P.H. Kenya Tea company.

Bharti Airtel Kenya
In 2004, he managed to purchase 60% ownership of the business from Vivendi for $230 million. Merali would transfer ownership only an hour later to Celtel for a $20 million profit, while owning 5% of Bharti Airtel's Kenyan wireless phone operations.

Sameer Group
Merali spent his time steering the affairs of the Sameer Group. The Sameer Group is a conglomerate of 15 Kenyan companies that range from financial services to agriculture and even information technology. Three of these companies appear on the Nairobi Stock Exchange and Merali was worth $210 million as of 2 November 2011.

Other investments
He was reported to have shares in the Commercial Bank of Africa as of 2003. Merali's purchase of the Grand Regency Hotel during that year caused a lot of controversy in the Kenya area.

Merali also held positions at the Kenya Export Promotion Council, the International Who's Who of Professionals, and the National Investment Council of Kenya. The President of Kenya has appointed him to positions such as membership in the Kenya Export Promotion Council, membership in The National Poverty Eradication Commission of Kenya, and membership in The Presidential Committee on Employment. He appeared at the 2011 World Economic Forum in Davos as one of the African delegates – making him one of the three Kenyan delegates. As of September 2011, Kenya Data Networks – one of his business ventures – was facing financial problems and the shareholders were ready to cause a shakedown in the entire management team. These financial problems came to fruition by 2013 when Merali relinquished control of the company.

In 2012, Merali invested in construction. Two of Merali's former firms, Kenya Data Networks and Swift Global were in the process of being merged into Great Britain's Liquid Telecoms as of February 2013. Many executive positions were declared redundant as a result of this multinational merger. Both retail and wholesale services for the lower end of the consumer spectrum were provided by both of these firms as individual companies; as rival Internet service provider Safaricom already had a firm grasp on the upper end of the market.

In June 2015, Forbes reported that Merali sold, a Ugandan milk processing subsidiary company of Sameer Group to Kenya's largest milk processor, Brookside Dairies.

In October 2016 Merali was set to open a $30 million milk processing factory in Nakuru to rival Kenya's largest milk processor Brookside Dairy Limited estimated to employ by 500 people by June 2017. In September 2016, another company controlled by Merali which was then Kenya's sole tyre manufacturer announced it would cut more than 600 jobs following closure of its factories in favour of imports from China. In December 2016 Merali invested $4 million in a macadamia plant in Kiambu through another of Sameer group's listed subsidiaries that is one of the largest producers of coffee in Kenya.

Personal life

Family
Merali's ancestors were believed to have emigrated from the state of Gujarat in what is now known as India. His mother's maiden name is assumed to be Patel; a surname occupied by famous Indian businessmen and 33% of all American mid-sized hotel owners.

His wife was Zarin Merali, who is a director of the Kenyan Paraplegic Organisation. She is also an interior design consultant.

Wealth
Since the inaugural ranking of Forbes list of Africa's richest in 2011, Merali ranked among top 3 richest people in Kenya, and among 40 richest in Africa 5 times. In 2015 he ranked 3rd richest in Kenya and 48th in Africa with a net worth of $370 million. In 2014 he ranked 2nd richest in Kenya with a net worth of $550 million. In 2013 he ranked 2nd in Kenya with a net worth of $430 million. In 2012 he was second richest with a net worth of $410 million. In the inaugural ranking of Africa's richest he ranked 3rd richest in Kenya with a net worth of $210 million.

Death
He died at a city hospital in Nairobi, after having an undisclosed short illness on the morning of 3 July 2021.

Philanthropy
Through the Zarina and Merali foundation, Merali gave $1.75 million to  $2.92 million yearly to various communities and caucuses.His biggest donation was $1.17 million donation to Kenyatta National Hospital to build a day care centre.

Merali also donated a prime beach property of 30 acres in affluent Malindi town, to the Kenyan government  for purposes of building a public beach.
In Nairobi he reserved a piece of land to establish a sports club jaffery's.

Legacy and honors

During the tenor of Evans Kidero as governor of Nairobi, a road within affluent estate Lavington, Nairobi was named Naushad Merali drive to honor merali's contribution to business growth in Kenya during his lifetime.

During his lifetime, Merali received coveted Kenyan state commendations of Chief Order of the Burning Spear (CBS.) and Elder of the Burning spear (EBS.)

References

1951 births
2021 deaths
Kenyan people of Indian descent
Kenyan Shia Muslims
Kenyan company founders
Kenyan businesspeople
Kenyan business executives
People from Nairobi
Kenyan people of Gujarati descent
Gujarati people
Khoja Ismailism